Ballygawley may refer to:

Ballygawley, County Londonderry, a townland in County Londonderry, Northern Ireland
Ballygawley, County Sligo, a village in County Sligo, Republic of Ireland
Ballygawley, County Tyrone, a village in County Tyrone, Northern Ireland